is the first single by the Japanese female pop group Dream Morning Musume, released in Japan on February 15, 2012 on the Zetima label.

Background 
As is usual for Hello! Project releases, all songs on the single are composed and written entirely by Tsunku. The first track is arranged by Shōichirō Hirata, and the second by Kaoru Ōkubo, which was exactly the same for the last two Morning Musume singles, "Only You" and "Kono Chikyū no Heiwa o Honki de Negatterun Da yo! / Kare to Issho ni Omise ga Shitai!" (except the Ai Takahashi Graduation Commemoration Edition).

The A-side is completely new, while the coupling track is a newly arranged re-recording of a song that previously appeared on the album Rainbow 7 by Morning Musume.

Also, this new title track is the theme song for an upcoming movie titled Atsushi Hime Number 1. It is the first movie produced by Tsunku, and it stars the Dream Morning Musume member Rika Ishikawa.

Recording 
Miki Fujimoto, who was on maternity leave from the group, still participated in recording the songs and in making the music video.

Music video 
The music video tells a story which centers around Rika Ishikawa. She is at the bar thinking about her lover, when he suddenly comes in with two other women.

The video also features a cameo appearance by Ai Takahashi, who participated in recording the single as well. She is not a member of the group and just recently, in September 2011, graduated from Morning Musume.

Release 
The single was released in two versions: a regular CD-only edition (catalog number EPCE-5848) and a CD+DVD limited edition (catalog number EPCE-5846/7). The bonus DVD contained the main version of the music video, which is not common for Hello! Project releases. Usually, the limited edition comes with a dance version, and one needs to buy the corresponding DVD single to get the main TV version of the video.

Chart performance 
The single debuted at number 7 in the Oricon daily sales ranking for February 14 (Musical releases in Japan arrive at stores one day before the specified release date.) In its first week, "Shining Butterfly" placed 12th in the Oricon Weekly Singles Chart.

Track listing 
All songs written and composed by Tsunku.
"Shining Butterfly" arranged by Shōichirō Hirata.
"Aozora ga Itsumademo Tsuzuku Yō na Mirai de Are! (2012 Dorimusu Ver.)" arranged by Kaoru Ōkubo.

Bonus 
Sealed into the first press of the Regular Edition:
 Gift application postcard

Charts

References

External links 
 
 Tsunku's comments on the single 
  
 
 Regular Edition, Oricon profile 
 First Press Limited Edition, Oricon profile 

2012 debut singles
Japanese film songs
Japanese-language songs
Morning Musume songs
Songs written by Tsunku
Song recordings produced by Tsunku
Zetima Records singles